MercadoLibre, Inc. (literally "free market" in Spanish, and known as Mercado Livre in Portuguese) is an Argentine company headquartered in Montevideo, Uruguay, incorporated in the United States that operates online marketplaces dedicated to e-commerce and online auctions, including mercadolibre.com. As of 2016, Mercado Libre had 174.2 million users in Latin America, making it the region's most popular e-commerce site by number of visitors. The company has operations in Argentina, Bolivia, Brazil, Chile, Colombia, Costa Rica, Dominican Republic, Mexico, Ecuador, Guatemala, Honduras, Peru, Panama, Uruguay, and Venezuela.

History 
Mercado Libre was founded in 1999 in Argentina. Founder and CEO Marcos Galperin established the company while attending Stanford University. He acquired funding from John Muse, co-founder of HM Capital Partners. Mercado Libre received additional funding from JPMorgan Partners, Flatiron Partners, Goldman Sachs, GE Capital, and Banco Santander Central Hispano. In 1999, Mercado Libre was chosen as an Endeavor company.

In September 2001, eBay purchased a 19.5% stake in the company. eBay sold its stake in Mercado Libre in 2016, but the companies continue to collaborate to expand eBay sellers into Latin America. eBay opened its first branded store on the Mercado Libre marketplace from Chile in March 2017.

The following month, Mercado Libre acquired iBazar Como, the Brazilian subsidiary of eBay's earlier acquisition, iBazar S.A. In 2006, MercadoLibre.com launched new operations in Costa Rica, Panama, and Dominican Republic.

In August 2007, Mercado Libre became the first Latin American technology company to be listed on the NASDAQ, under the ticker MELI. Mercado Libre acquired competitor DeRemate's operations in August 2008. Mercado Libre also acquired Classified Media Group (CMG) in 2008. CMG established the Latin American e-commerce portals tucarro.com and tuinmueble.com.

In 2011, the company transitioned its platform to open source technology. The transition allowed application programming interface (API) developers to expand the platform's solutions and services. In 2013, Mercado Libre launched the MeLi Commerce Fund, dedicated to investing in technology startups that create software using Mercado Libre's APIs. By August 2016, the fund had invested $1.5 million in 15 companies in Argentina, Brazil and Mexico. Mercado Libre acquired Portal Inmobiliario, a Chilean classified ad website, in 2014. In 2015, Mercado Libre announced its acquisition of Metroscúbicos.com, the portal of Mexico-based real estate company Grupo Expansión.

In 2016, Mercado Libre relocated its Brazilian headquarters to new offices in São Paulo, Brazil. The 17,000 square meter complex, named Melicidade, held a cafeteria, auditorium, gym, beauty parlor, meeting and training rooms, and a recreation area. In March 2016, Mercado Libre announced its expansion into Córdoba, Argentina with its new software center. Mercado Libre opened its first Colombian office in Bogotá in October 2016. It was the company's fourth customer service center in Latin America. The company's other customer service centers are in Argentina, Brazil and Uruguay.

In 2019, Mercado Libre opened its first distribution centers in Argentina, Brazil and Mexico.

In March 2020, Mercado Libre announced its new distribution centers in Chile and Colombia. In June 2020, Mercado Libre announced its new software center in Colombia.

In March 2021, Mercado Libre announced a massive investment of $1.8 billion in its Brazilian operations.

Operations 
Mercado Libre operates under five main business units. MarketPlace is its platform for users to sell products, Mercado Pago is its payment platform for online sales, Mercado Publicado is the advertising portion of Mercado Libre, Mercado Shops is a tool designed to enhance the platform's overall ecosystem, and Mercado Crédito is the company's credit line.

Mercado Libre's MarketPlace is a platform designed to match buyers and sellers. Customers bid for items or pay a set price for offered products. Items are delivered after payment, and users can provide feedback. 3,000 official stores or brands work with Mercado Libre.

Mercado Libre also runs a real estate and motors division under the name Mercado Libre Classificados. Realtors pay a monthly fee to list properties and automobiles on the Mercado Libre platform.

Mercado Libre launched MercadoPago, a secure payment system, to diversify payment options. MercadoPago processed 138.7 million transactions in 2016, which was a 73% improvement from 2015. Launched in 2012, MercadoShops was designed to allow small and medium-sized companies to open virtual stores on their existing websites. The stores feature integration with social network sites. In October 2014, a mobile app was released for MercadoPago which used a credit card reader to allow charges to be processed using a tablet or smartphone using a QR code. The company expanded MercadoPago into Colombia in July 2016.

Mercado Crédito's credit process works with buyers and sellers. Rate types for credit lines are determined through a borrower profile.

References

External links 

Online auction websites of Argentina
EBay
Portuguese-language websites
Spanish-language websites
Internet properties established in 1999
Android (operating system) software
IOS software
2001 mergers and acquisitions
2007 initial public offerings
PayPal
1999 establishments in Argentina
Argentine brands